Ralston Varlack (born 14 July 1974 in Road Town, Tortola) is a sprinter who represented the British Virgin Islands.

Varlack represented British Virgin Islands at the Summer Olympics when he competed in the 1996 Summer Olympics in Atlanta, he entered the 4x100 metres relay and the 4x400 metres relay the team finished 7th and 6th in there heats respectively so didn't qualify for the next round.

References

1974 births
Living people
British Virgin Islands male sprinters
Athletes (track and field) at the 1994 Commonwealth Games
Athletes (track and field) at the 1996 Summer Olympics
Athletes (track and field) at the 1998 Commonwealth Games
Olympic athletes of the British Virgin Islands
Commonwealth Games competitors for the British Virgin Islands